Maqui can refer to:

 Aristotelia chilensis, or maqui berry, a plant from South America
 Maqui Edicions, a Spanish publishing house specialized in role-playing games; see Vajra Enterprises
 Spanish Maquis, resistance in Spain against the Francoist State
 Maqui, a term, ultimately of Algonquian origin, used by French colonists for the Mohawk People

See also 
 Maki (disambiguation)
 Maquis (disambiguation)